This is a list of defunct airlines of Oceania.

American Samoa
Defunct airlines of American Samoa include:

Australia

Fiji
Defunct airlines of Fiji include:

French Polynesia
Defunct airlines of French Polynesia include:

Guam
Defunct airlines of Guam include:

Kiribati
Defunct airlines of Kiribati include:

New Zealand

Norfolk Island
Defunct airlines of the Norfolk Island include:

Northern Mariana Islands
Defunct airlines of the Northern Mariana Islands include:

Palau 
Defunct airlines of Palau include:

Papua New Guinea

Samoa
Defunct airlines of Samoa include:

Tonga

Vanuatu
Defunct airlines of Vanuatu include:

See also
 List of airlines of Oceania

References

Bibliography

Oceania
 Defunct